Calmont may refer to:

Several communes in France:
 Calmont, Aveyron, in the Aveyron department
 Calmont, Haute-Garonne, in the Haute-Garonne department
 Calmont (hill), a 380m high hill on the Moselle in Germany